Faith Fowler is the senior pastor of Cass Community United Methodist Church and the executive director of Cass Community Social Services, a large nonprofit in Detroit that serves more than 700,000 meals a year and houses about 300 homeless people per night alongside a day program, medical clinics, and a job center. She has been the director of Cass Community Social Services since 1994.

Under Fowler's leadership, Cass Community Social Services has expanded its jobs programs and campus. Her original goal was to expand the social services available in the Cass Corridor beyond emergency-only programs. Fowler's focus on sustainability and jobs has helped address income inequality in Detroit by creating jobs for homeless people and people under the poverty line, through products like mud mats made of repurposed illegally dumped tires, coasters made wood sourced from demolished houses, and Detroit-branded sandals. Her expansion of Cass Community's programs and properties has increased the number of homeless people who have successfully moved into transitional housing. Fowler helped create the Tiny Homes Detroit project, Cass Community Publishing House, and Cass Green Industries, which produces the sustainable products sold by Cass Community Social Services.

Fowler graduated from Albion College and has received a Master of Divinity from Boston University School of Theology and a Master of Public Administration from the University of Michigan-Dearborn.

Fowler felt the call to pastorship in junior high, but was told by her church's pastor that she was "wrong". Nonetheless, she studied religion and English at Albion College. To save enough money for a Master of Divinity degree from Boston University, she worked a full-time job at a children's care and rehabilitation facility, and a part-time job at a church youth program.

Fowler has also served as an adjunct professor at University of Michigan-Dearborn, a board member for the Cass Corridor Neighborhood Development Corporation, an advisory board member of the Detroit Area Agency on Aging, and chaired the Detroit Brownfield Redevelopment Authority Advisory Committee. She is the author of two books.

Further reading

References 

Boston University School of Theology alumni
Albion College alumni
University of Michigan–Dearborn alumni
People from Detroit
Activists from Detroit
Clergy from Detroit
Businesspeople from Detroit
Writers from Detroit
Methodist ministers
Year of birth missing (living people)
Living people